J42 may refer to:
 County Route J42 (California)
 Elongated pentagonal orthobirotunda, a Johnson solid (J42)
 , a minesweeper of the Royal Navy
 Pratt & Whitney J42, a turbojet engine
 Tracheitis